Hecla is an unincorporated community located in Hopkins County, Kentucky, United States.  It was also called Hechla.

Hecla began as a company town where the workers of a mine operated by the Hecla Coal and Mining Company lived. The first mine opened there in 1873.

References

Unincorporated communities in Hopkins County, Kentucky
Unincorporated communities in Kentucky